is a series of video games published by Capcom for the PlayStation Portable and released in Japan on June 29, 2006. It is a dating sim in which the player has to take photos of or participate in mini-games with three Japanese bikini idols.

The series consists of three episodes, each featuring a different idol:
 
 
 

Each episode is available as a limited edition box containing more pictures of the game, a DVD and a bikini identical to the one worn by the model.

Gameplay 

Finder Love has two distinct game modes: an adventure game and a photography game.

The adventure part is similar to most Japanese romantic adventure games: the player reads and listens to what a girl says and occasionally has to choose an answer. The dialogue sequences are interspersed with mini-games such as rock-paper-scissors or rhythm games like PaRappa the Rapper.

During the photography game, the goal is to take successful shots of the model to access new outfits. It is also possible to exchange pictures with friends.

References

External links 
 

Adventure games
Dating sims
2006 video games
Japan-exclusive video games
PlayStation Portable games
PlayStation Portable-only games
Capcom games
Video games developed in Japan